PC Leisure was the United Kingdom's first magazine dedicated exclusively to IBM PC compatible (PC) entertainment and was published by EMAP between spring 1990 and September 1991. A total of nine issues were published in its lifetime, the first four being quarterly with the remaining five bimonthly. The magazine was eventually incorporated into PC Review, a new monthly publication launched on October 15, 1991.

History
Within the UK prior to PC Leisure's release, PC entertainment news was supplied via general computing and multi-format magazines such as The One and New Computer Express, but by 1990 the PC entertainment market had sufficiently developed to warrant the introduction of a dedicated magazine.

In November 1989, EMAP tested the waters by including a free PC Leisure preview copy along with What Personal Computer, and the feedback from this venture filled the letters section of the launch issue the following spring.

In May 1991, PC Leisure became the recipient of the PC coverage originally published within the pages of the 16-bit multi-format magazine The One, as EMAP decided to split it into The One for Amiga Games and The One for ST Games. A number of the staff moved to working on The One for Amiga Games.

The final issue #9 Sep/Oct 1991 included a two-page special across pages 28 and 29 stating that the magazine was going to be renamed PC Review and released monthly from October 15, 1991.

Staff

Editors
 Ciarán Brennan, Spring 1990 to Jan/Feb 1991
 Steve Cooke, Mar/Apr 1991 only
 Garth Sumpter, May/Jun 1991 to Jul/Aug 1991
 Christina Erskine, Sep/Oct 1991 only

Art Editor
 Jim Willis

Designers
Jenny Abrook, Andy Beswick, Gregory Brown, Allister Cordice, Pete Hawkes, Nick Howells, Gareth Jones, Yvette Nicholls, Simon Poulter, Richard Slater, Andrea Walker and Jim Willis.

Photographer
 Ian Watson

Contributors
Rob Beattie, Kelly Beswick, Neil Blaber, Matt Bloomfield, Paul Boughton, Clive Bremner, Robert Browning, John Cook, Steve Cooke, Tony Dillon, Jim Douglas, Alan Dykes, Christina Erskine, David Fitzgerald, Rik Haynes, Ed Henning, Gordon Houghton, Fiona Keating, Steve Keen, Eugene Lacey, Gary Liddon, Chris Long, Declan McColgan, Steve Merritt, John Minson, Tony Naqvi, Matt Nicholson, Frank O'Hara, Lee Paddon, Russell Patient, Mike Pattenden, Mark Patterson, Gary Penn, Paul Presley, Matt Regan, Gail Robinson, Laurence Scotford, Garth Sumpter, Alastair Swinnerton, Jimmy Taylor, David Upchurch, Austin Walsh and Gary Whitta.

See also
Historical EMAP Magazines
The One

References

External links

A selection of scanned issues of the magazine accessible via Thunor's website.

Defunct computer magazines published in the United Kingdom
Magazines established in 1990
Magazines disestablished in 1991
Magazines published in London
Monthly magazines published in the United Kingdom